Louisa Lennox is the birthname of:

Louisa Berkeley, Countess of Berkeley (1694–1716), English noblewoman
Lady Louisa Conolly (1743–1821), one of the famous Lennox sisters